The Belfry of Brussels was a medieval bell tower in central Brussels, Belgium. Built long before the city's current Town Hall on the Grand-Place/Grote Markt (Brussels' main square), whose tower it should not be confused with, it formerly stood in front of the Church of St. Nicholas until its collapse on 25 July 1714. It was never rebuilt.

See also

 History of Brussels
 Belfries of Belgium and France

References

Notes

Further reading
 
 
 
 

Bell towers in Belgium
City of Brussels